Tevita Funa (born 3 January 1998) is a professional rugby union footballer for the New South Wales Waratahs and a former rugby league  and  for the Manly-Warringah Sea Eagles in the NRL.

Early life
Funa was born in Sydney, Australia, and is of Tongan descent.

He played his junior rugby league for the Guildford Owls and Mounties.

Playing career

2020
Funa made his debut in round 5 of the 2020 NRL season for Manly-Warringah against the Brisbane Broncos. He scored a try as Manly won 20–18.

He made a total of 12 appearances throughout the year scoring five tries.  Manly missed out on the finals finishing 13th.

2021
Funa was limited to only four matches in the 2021 NRL season for Manly.  On October 6, he was released by the Manly club.

References

External links
Sea Eagles profile
Tevita Funa | Rugby Database Profile

1998 births
Living people
Australian rugby league players
Rugby league wingers
Manly Warringah Sea Eagles players
Australian sportspeople of Tongan descent
Rugby league players from Sydney
Australian rugby union players
Rugby union wings
Rugby union fullbacks
New South Wales Waratahs players